Black Army may refer to several different groups and affiliations:

 Black Army of Hungary, the royal army of Matthias Corvinus, a 15th-century king of Hungary
 Black Flag Army (1857–1895), a splinter remnant of the Taiping rebels
 Black Guards (1917–1919), several anarchist factions of the Russian Civil War
 Armata Neagră (1949–1950), an anti-Soviet group in Bessarabia
 Crna Legija or Black Legion (1941–1945), Ustaše Brigades during World War II
 Revolutionary Insurgent Army of Ukraine (1918–1921), led by Nestor Makhno
 Black Army, the biggest supporter group of AIK

See also 
 Blackguard (disambiguation)
 Black Legion (disambiguation)